Glenn Ang Chong (born July 12, 1974) is a Filipino politician. He was elected as a Member of the House of Representatives, representing the Lone District of Biliran. He held the position for three years before he lost his re-election bid to Rogelio J. Espina, twin brother of Gerardo Espina Sr.

Personal life
Chong was born on July 12, 1974 in Naval, Biliran. He is a lawyer and certified public accountant by profession. He obtained his Doctor of Humanities (Honoris Causa) degree in University of San Carlos.

Political career
He won his election in 2007 after defeating former Representative Gerardo Espina Sr., who had held the seat from 1995 to 2004, making him the very first representative of Biliran who did not belong to Espina political clan. He sought re-election in 2010 and 2013 but lost twice to Rogelio Espina. He ran under Lakas–Kampi and Pwersa ng Masang Pilipino, respectively.

Chong was a candidate for Senator of the Philippines in the 2019 Philippine general election.

Ambush
Chong's father, Charlie, was ambushed but not hurt, on the street fronting his Biliran house on June 7, 2008. His two bodyguards were killed while another was seriously wounded by four armed men, which included a policeman assigned to the Naval police headquarters who was arrested. Chong accused his family's political enemies for the attack, since his father filed a 2007 graft case against Biliran Gov. Rogelio Espina with the Ombudsman.

Richard "Red" Santillan, Chong's close aide, was ambushed in Cainta, Rizal on December 9, 2018. His body was recovered the following day. Thirty bullet holes were found in Chong's car, which Santillan was driving at the time of ambush. Santillan was with a female companion, who was also killed, in the car, wherein he was on the way to bring her home when the incident happened. Chong then is a vocal Smartmatic critic, having testified about electoral fraud in both Senate and House hearings. The Public Attorney's Office filed charges against the policemen who are believed involved. In 2019, the National Bureau of Investigation recommended murder charges against 22 policemen for the killing, saying that it was a rubout and not an encounter, as claimed by the police. Later that year, the Antipolo Regional Trial Court issued an arrest warrant for 20 police officers, each had charged with two counts of murder, with no bail recommended; twelve of them have been surrendered.

References

External links
 

|-

|-

People from Biliran
1974 births
Living people
Liberal Party (Philippines) politicians
Members of the House of Representatives of the Philippines from Biliran